Lawrence Peter King (born 20 October 1966) is a professor of economics at the University of Massachusetts Amherst. Prior to 2017, he held a position as a professor of sociology and political economy at the University of Cambridge. His research work is focused on the political economy of postcommunism and, more recently, the political economy of public health.

King graduated from the University of Michigan, Ann Arbor (BA), and the University of California, Los Angeles (MA and PhD). Prior to his appointment in Cambridge, he served as assistant professor (1997–2003) and associate professor (2004–2006) at Yale University.

References

1966 births
Living people
Academics of the University of Cambridge
Yale University faculty
American sociologists
Political economists
University of Michigan alumni
University of California, Los Angeles alumni